Mujahidul Islam Qasmi (1936–4 April 2002) was an Indian Mufti, Qadhi and Islamic scholar, founder of Islamic Fiqh Academy. He served as the President of All India Muslim Personal Law Board.

Biography
Qasmi was born in 1936 in Darbhanga, British India. He was educated at Madrasa Mahmood al-Ulum, Damla and local madrasas of Mau, Uttar Pradesh and later joined Darul Uloom Deoband from where he graduated in 1955. In Deoband, he studied under Hussain Ahmad Madni, Syed Fakhruddin Ahmad and Abdul Haffeez Balyawi.

Qasmi taught in Jamia Rahmania in Munger and established Islamic Fiqh Academy in 1989. He was also a member of International Islamic Fiqh Academy, Jeddah, Fiqh Academy of Mecca and Aligarh Muslim University's court. He was founding member of All India Muslim Personal Law Board and was appointed as its President after the death of Abul Hasan Ali Nadwi in 1999. He launched All India Milli Council to bring Muslim organizations altogether on a single platform. Through Milli Council, Qasmi played a key role in the removal of TADA and restored confidence of Muslim youth.

Qāsmi's religious and legal verdicts have been published as Fatawa Qadhi in Urdu by the Islamic Fiqh Academy.

He died of cancer on 4 April 2002.

Literary works
Qasmi authored over 40 books which include:
 Al-Waqf
 Annizamul Qadai
 The Islamic Concept of Animal Slaughter 
 Contemporary Medical Issues in Islamic Jurisprudence.

Awards
Qasmi was conferred with following awards:
 Community Leadership Award from Al-Ameen Educational Trust
 2nd Shah Waliullah Award from Institute of Objective Studies, New Delhi 
 Abul Hasan Ali Nadwi Award from American Federation of Muslims of Indian Origin
 Best Islamic Personality Award from Muslim Educational Association of Southern India
 Fiqh Award from Executive Arbitration Committee, Government of Kuwait
 Gold Medal from the Cabinet of Morocco

Legacy
Nomana Khalid wrote her M Phil thesis "Qadhi Mujahidul Islam Ki Fiqh-e-Islami Mein Khidmat" from Punjab University, Lahore.

References

Muftis
20th-century Muslim scholars of Islam
1936 births
2002 deaths
People from Darbhanga
Darul Uloom Deoband alumni